Fremantle is a port city proclaimed in 1929 in Western Australia. Fremantle may also refer to:

Places

Australia
 Places related to Fremantle, the port city of Perth, the capital of Western Australia, Australia
 City of Fremantle, a local government area (LGA)
 Fremantle (suburb), a suburb in the LGA called City of Fremantle
 Division of Fremantle, a federal division of the Australian House of Representatives
 Electoral district of Fremantle, a state lower house electoral district
 Fremantle Football Club, an Australian Football League team also known as the '"Fremantle Dockers"'
 Fremantle Prison, in Fremantle, Western Australia

United Kingdom
 Freemantle, a suburb and electoral ward of Southampton, a city in Hampshire, United Kingdom

Other uses 
 Fremantle (surname)
 Abagail Freemantle, the name of Mother Abagail, a fictional character in Stephen King's book, The Stand
 Fremantle, the code name for Maemo 5, a mobile Linux distribution developed by Nokia for the N900 phone
 , class of 15 Australian patrol boats in service from 1979 to 2007
 Fremantle Doctor, the local sea breeze for Perth, Western Australia
 Freemantle F.C., a now defunct English football club, based in Freemantle, Southampton
 Fremantle (company), a multi-national media corporation producing many major TV shows, formerly known as FremantleMedia
Fremantle Australia, an Australian production and entertainment company of Fremantle
, two ships of the Royal Australian Navy
Fairey Fremantle, a British seaplane of the 1920s

See also